Eals Bridge is a stone bridge across the River South Tyne near Knarsdale in Northumberland.

History
This structure has two stone arches and was completed in 1733 but seriously damaged by flooding in 1829. Widened in 1973, it carries road traffic and is a Grade II listed structure.

References

Bridges in Northumberland
Crossings of the River Tyne